Ariobarzanes III, surnamed Eusebes Philorhomaios, "Pious and Friend of the Romans" (Ariobarzánēs Eusebḗs Philorōmaíos), was the king of Cappadocia from ca. 51 BC until 42 BC.

He was of Persian and Greek ancestry. The Roman Senate agreed that he was to be the successor of his father, Ariobarzanes II of Cappadocia; Cicero, Roman governor of Cilicia, noted that he was surrounded by enemies who included his mother, Athenais.

Originally highly supportive of Pompey despite the cost, he was maintained in his position after Julius Caesar won the civil war in Rome, even gaining territory with the addition of Lesser Armenia. The liberator Cassius Longinus had him executed in 42 BC because he would not allow more Roman intervention in his kingdom. He was succeed by his brother, Ariarathes X of Cappadocia.

References

Kings of Cappadocia
42 BC deaths
People executed by the Roman Republic
1st-century BC rulers in Asia
Roman client rulers
1st-century BC executions
Year of birth unknown